The 2018 UEFA Women's Under-19 Championship qualifying competition was a women's under-19 football competition that determined the seven teams joining the automatically qualified hosts Switzerland in the 2018 UEFA Women's Under-19 Championship final tournament.

Apart from Switzerland, 48 of the remaining 54 UEFA member national teams entered the qualifying competition (including Kosovo who entered a competitive women's national team tournament for the first time). Players born on or after 1 January 1999 are eligible to participate.

Format
The qualifying competition consists of two rounds:
Qualifying round: The 48 teams are drawn into 12 groups of four teams. Each group is played in single round-robin format at one of the teams selected as hosts after the draw. The 12 group winners, the 12 runners-up, and the four third-placed teams with the best record against the first and second-placed teams in their group advance to the elite round.
Elite round: The 28 teams are drawn into seven groups of four teams. Each group is played in single round-robin format at one of the teams selected as hosts after the draw. The seven group winners qualify for the final tournament.

Initially the elite round would consist of 24 teams, drawn into six groups of four teams, with the six group winners and the runner-up with the best record against the first and third-placed teams in their group qualifying for the final tournament. After the qualifying round draw was held, UEFA decided to expand the elite round from 24 to 28 teams, allowing four more third-placed teams to advance to the elite round.

The schedule of each mini-tournament is as follows (Regulations Article 20.04):

Tiebreakers
In the qualifying round and elite round, teams are ranked according to points (3 points for a win, 1 point for a draw, 0 points for a loss), and if tied on points, the following tiebreaking criteria are applied, in the order given, to determine the rankings (Regulations Articles 14.01 and 14.02):
Points in head-to-head matches among tied teams;
Goal difference in head-to-head matches among tied teams;
Goals scored in head-to-head matches among tied teams;
If more than two teams are tied, and after applying all head-to-head criteria above, a subset of teams are still tied, all head-to-head criteria above are reapplied exclusively to this subset of teams;
Goal difference in all group matches;
Goals scored in all group matches;
Penalty shoot-out if only two teams have the same number of points, and they met in the last round of the group and are tied after applying all criteria above (not used if more than two teams have the same number of points, or if their rankings are not relevant for qualification for the next stage);
Disciplinary points (red card = 3 points, yellow card = 1 point, expulsion for two yellow cards in one match = 3 points);
UEFA coefficient for the qualifying round draw;
Drawing of lots.

To determine the four best third-placed teams from the qualifying round, the results against the teams in fourth place are discarded. The following criteria are applied (Regulations Article 15.01):
Points;
Goal difference;
Goals scored;
Disciplinary points;
UEFA coefficient for the qualifying round draw;
Drawing of lots.

Qualifying round

Draw
The draw for the qualifying round was held on 11 November 2016, 10:00 CET (UTC+1), at the UEFA headquarters in Nyon, Switzerland.

The teams were seeded according to their coefficient ranking, calculated based on the following:
2014 UEFA Women's Under-19 Championship final tournament and qualifying competition (qualifying round and elite round)
2015 UEFA Women's Under-19 Championship final tournament and qualifying competition (qualifying round and elite round)
2016 UEFA Women's Under-19 Championship final tournament and qualifying competition (qualifying round and elite round)

Each group contained one team from Pot A, one team from Pot B, one team from Pot C, and one team from Pot D. For political reasons, Russia and Ukraine, Azerbaijan and Armenia, Serbia and Kosovo, and Bosnia and Herzegovina and Kosovo would not be drawn in the same group.

Notes
Teams marked in bold have qualified for the final tournament.

Groups
The qualifying round must be played by 29 October 2017, and on the following FIFA International Match Calendar dates unless all four teams agree to play on another date:
11–19 September 2017
16–24 October 2017

Times up to 28 October 2017 are CEST (UTC+2), thereafter times are CET (UTC+1).

Group 1

Note: Iceland were originally to host.

Group 2

Group 3

Group 4

Group 5

''Matches of the first matchday were postponed from 17 to 18 October due to wildfires in Portugal.

Group 6

Group 7

Group 8

Group 9

Group 10

Group 11

Group 12

Ranking of third-placed teams
To determine the four best third-placed teams from the qualifying round which advance to the elite round, only the results of the third-placed teams against the first and second-placed teams in their group are taken into account.

Elite round

Draw
The draw for the elite round was held on 24 November 2017, 11:00 CET (UTC+1), at the UEFA headquarters in Nyon, Switzerland.

The teams were seeded according to their results in the qualifying round. Each group contained one team from Pot A, one team from Pot B, one team from Pot C, and one team from Pot D. Winners and runners-up from the same qualifying round group could not be drawn in the same group, but the best third-placed teams could be drawn in the same group as winners or runners-up from the same qualifying round group.

Groups
The elite round must be played on the following FIFA International Match Calendar dates unless all four teams agree to play on another date:
2–10 April 2018
4–12 June 2018

All times are CEST (UTC+2).

Group 1

Group 2

Group 3

Group 4

Group 5

Group 6

Group 7

Qualified teams
The following eight teams qualified for the final tournament.

1 Bold indicates champions for that year. Italic indicates hosts for that year.

Goalscorers
13 goals

 Fenna Kalma

10 goals

 Amelie Delabre

9 goals

 Andrea Stašková

8 goals

 Jutta Rantala

7 goals

 Agnese Bonfantini
 Carla Bautista

6 goals

 Mariam Abdulai Toloba
 Michaela Dubcová
 Anna-Lena Stolze
 Sofia Cantore
 Victoria Pelova
 Joëlle Smits
 Sophie Haug

5 goals

 Kamila Dubcová
 Sarah Jankovska
 Ella Toone
 Léa Khelifi
 Jessy Roux
 Katalin Tímea Tolnai
 Arianna Caruso
 Andrea Norheim
 Allegra Poljak

4 goals

 Dajan Hashemi
 Alice Regazzoli
 Mădălina Boroș
 Ashleigh Weerden
 Damaris Egurrola
 Rosa Márquez

3 goals

 Marie Minnaert
 Maria Hovmark
 Agnete Nielsen
 Janni Thomsen
 Lauren Hemp
 Jessica Ngunga
 Emmaliina Tulkki
 Roosa Tuominen
 Clémentine Canon
 Melissa Kössler
 Paulina Krumbiegel
 Lena Oberdorf
 Anna Júlia Csiki
 Hlín Eiríksdóttir
 Sólveig Jóhannesdóttir
 Eva van Deursen
 Noah Waterham
 Roksana Ratajczyk
 Joana Martins
 Miljana Ivanović
 Paula Fernández
 Lucía Rodríguez
 Loreta Kullashi
 Ece Türkoğlu

2 goals

 Magdalena Bachler
 Melanie Brunnthaler
 Shari Van Belle
 Michaela Khýrová
 Kateřina Vojtková
 Mille Gejl
 Signe Holt Andersen
 Sofie Svava
 Hannah Cain
 Anna Filbey
 Sarita Maria Mittfoss
 Nea Nyrhinen
 Lina Boussaha
 Mickaélla Cardia
 Ella Palis
 Lisa Ebert
 Lea Schneider
 Brigitta Pulins
 Bergdís Fanney Einarsdóttir
 Benedetta Glionna
 Shira Elinav
 Williënne ter Beek
 Kerstin Casparij
 Bente Jansen
 Noor Eckhoff
 Camilla Linberg
 Emilie Nautnes
 Jenny Kristine Røsholm Olsen
 Klaudia Miłek
 Maja Osińska
 Kasandra Parczewska
 Maria Inês
 Ines Torcato Macedo
 Constança Silva
 Carla McManus
 Saoirse Noonan
 Tiegan Ruddy
 Milena Nikitina
 Adrijana Mori
 Teresa Abelleira
 Olga Carmona
 Emma Engström
 Ebba Hed
 Paulina Nyström
 Kader Hançar
 Nicole Kozlova
 Nadiia Kunina
 Daisy Evan-Watkins
 Cassia Pike

1 goal

 Julia Hickelsberger
 Jennifer Klein
 Maileen Mössner
 Jana Scharnböck
 Johanna Schneider
 Laura Wienroither
 Cagla Kanpara
 Merve Ozdemir
 Vusala Seyfatdinova
 Alina Lodyga
 Karina Olkhovik
 Kaily Dhondt
 Yenthe Kerckhofs
 Hanne Merkelbach
 Lisa Petry
 Tiffanie Vanderdonckt
 Ella Vierendeels
 Minela Gačanica
 Edina Habibović
 Helena Spajić
 Chryso Michael
 Marie Bohatová
 Lucie Dudová
 Aneta Malatová
 Adéla Radová
 Kristýna Siváková
 Gabriela Šlajsová
 Karen Holmgaard
 Cecilie Johansen
 Flo Allen
 Bridget Galloway
 Shania Hayles
 Taylor Hinds
 Lois Kathleen Joel
 Jessica Jones
 Esme Beth Morgan
 Aimee Palmer
 Rebecca Rayner
 Grace Smith
 Hanna-Lisa Kuslap
 Rebekka Fjallsá Benbakoura
 Lea Hansen
 Julia Haikonen
 Sanni Ojanen
 Emma Peuhkurinen
 Oumy Stéphanie Bayo
 Daïna Bourma
 Maëlle Lakrar
 Marion Rey
 Nina Richard
 Irina Khaburdzania
 Gina-Maria Chmielinski
 Christin Martina Meyer
 Verena Wieder
 Despoina Chatzinikolaou
 Panagiota Papaioannou
 Grigoria Pouliou
 Eszter Csigi
 Enikő Molnár
 Adrienn Oláh
 Kristín Dís Árnadóttir
 Anita Daníelsdóttir
 Ásdís Halldórsdóttir
 Stefanía Ragnarsdóttir
 Neli Haj
 Sarit Winstok
 Sara Baldi
 Isabel Cacciamali
 Melanie Kuenrath
 Beatrice Merlo
 Elena Nichele
 Elisa Polli
 Erika Santoro
 Jehona Shala
 Anastasija Fjodorova
 Karlīna Miksone
 Paulina Potapova
 Liucija Vaitukaitytė
 Ulza Maksuti
 Maja Šaranović
 Caitlin Dijkstra
 Lisa Doorn
 Lynn Wilms
 Rebecca Bassett
 Caitlyn Hamilton
 Vilde Birkeli
 Elin Åhgren Sørum
 Olaug Tvedten
 Dominika Gąsieniec
 Nikola Karczewska
 Joanna Olszewska
 Anita Turkiewicz
 Anna Zając
 Marcjanna Zawadzka
 Weronika Zawistowska
 Maria Zbyrad
 Diva Meira
 Orla Casey
 Kate Mooney
 Lauryn O'Callaghan
 Nicole Piperea
 Georgiana Denisa Predoi
 Kristina Cherkasova
 Viktoriya Dubova
 Yana Kuzmina
 Polina Organova
 Elena Shesterneva
 Lauren Davidson
 Samantha Kerr
 Tijana Filipović
 Andjela Frajtović
 Ivana Trbojević
 Andrea Bogorová
 Tamara Gmitterová
 Mária Mikolajová
 Martina Šurnovská
 Sara Agrež
 Maruša Česnik
 Sara Makovec
 Candela Andújar
 Alejandra Serrano
 Anna Torrodà
 Ariam-Berhane Gebreyohannes
 Nellie Lilja
 Agnes Nyberg
 Ayşe Şevval Ay
 Irem Eren
 Gwennan Davies
 Ella Powell
 Bronwen Thomas
 Amina Vine

1 own goal

 Fabiola Mullaj (against Ukraine)
 Lena Andriasyan (against Scotland)
 Ani Karapetyan (against Turkey)
 Laura Wienroither (against Spain)
 Alina Scherbo (against Sweden)
 Aldina Hamzić (against Serbia)
 Ivana Hrnjkaš (against Austria)
 Lucie Dudová (against Scotland)
 Siret Räämet (against Netherlands)
 Léa Kergal (against Italy)
 Leonora Ejupi (against Germany)
 Ivana Čabarkapa (against Germany)
 Maja Šaranović (against Germany)
 Caitlyn Hamilton (against Norway)
 Georgiana Dârle (against Slovakia)
 Amy Muir (against Hungary)
 Diana Lemešová (against Germany)
 Aimee Watson (against England)

References

External links

Qualification
2018
2017 in women's association football
2018 in women's association football
2017 in youth association football
2018 in youth association football
September 2017 sports events in Europe
October 2017 sports events in Europe
April 2018 sports events in Europe
June 2018 sports events in Europe